Caritas Institute of Community Education is a self-financing institution of higher education based in Hong Kong. It was created on 1 January 2014, by combining all community education schools managed by Caritas Hong Kong. The Institution aims to provide a combination of sub-degree and vocational training programmes. Courses offered by CICE are recognised by the Hong Kong Council for Accreditation of Academic and Vocational Qualifications up to QF Level 4.

References

Catholic universities and colleges in Hong Kong
Universities and colleges in Hong Kong